Maria Bethânia: Music is Perfume is a 2005 documentary film by French-born, Switzerland-based director Georges Gachot that focuses on Brazilian singer Maria Bethânia.  The film follows the star in the recording studio, the concert stage and in a visit to her 100-year-old mother in Bahia.  The film also included appearances by Brazilian music stars including Caetano Veloso (Bethânia's brother), Gilberto Gil, Chico Buarque and Nana Caymmi.

References

External links 
 
 

2005 films
Documentary films about singers
Swiss documentary films
2005 documentary films
Documentary films about women in music